Gracie Square Hospital is a psychiatric hospital located at 420 East 76th Street on the Upper East Side of Manhattan, in New York City.  The hospital has 157 beds for in-patients, as well as units focused on adult and geriatric psychiatry, drug rehabilitation, and short-term care. The hospital was built and founded by Cynthia Zirinsky, a mental health care professional, and her husband Richard Zirinsky, a New York City real-estate developer.

The hospital had 220 beds when it opened in 1958.  The hospital is a member of the NewYork-Presbyterian Healthcare System.

Notable patients
Eddie Fisher, American singer
Anthony Hecht, American poet
Thelonious Monk, American jazz pianist and composer
Phil Ochs, American protest singer and songwriter
Paul Robeson, American singer, actor, and political activist
Audra McDonald, American actress and singer

References

External links
Gracie Square Hospital website

Hospital buildings completed in 1958
NewYork–Presbyterian Healthcare System
Psychiatric hospitals in New York (state)
Hospitals in Manhattan
Upper East Side
1958 establishments in New York City